18880 Toddblumberg, provisional designation , is a background asteroid from the outer region of the asteroid belt, approximately 4 kilometers in diameter. It was discovered on 10 December 1999, by LINEAR at the Lincoln Laboratory's Experimental Test Site, near Socorro, New Mexico, United States. The asteroid was named after Todd Blumberg, a 2003 ISEF contest awardee.

Orbit and classification 

Toddblumberg orbits the Sun in the outer main-belt at a distance of 2.6–3.8 AU once every 5 years and 9 months (2,096 days). Its orbit has an eccentricity of 0.18 and an inclination of 10° with respect to the ecliptic. The first precovery was taken at Palomar Observatory (DSS) in 1953, extending the body's observation arc by 46 years prior to its official discovery observation at Socorro.

Although discovered by LINEAR, Toddblumberg is not a near-Earth asteroid. Its closest approach to the Sun (perihelion) is about double the maximum distance of 1.3 AU that qualifies an asteroid as "near-Earth".

Physical characteristics

Diameter and albedo 

According to the survey carried out by NASA's Wide-field Infrared Survey Explorer with its subsequent NEOWISE mission, Toddblumberg measures 4.3 kilometers in diameter and its surface has an albedo of 0.265.

Lightcurve 

As of 2017, Toddblumbergs spectral type and rotation period remain unknown.

Naming 

This minor planet was named for Todd James Blumberg (born 1984), a student at the Plano Senior High School in Plano, Texas, who won the Intel International Science and Engineering Fair (ISEF) award for his microbiology project in 2003.

Since 2001, hundreds of secondary school students who have won awards at science fairs have had asteroids named after them. The approved naming citation was published by the Minor Planet Center on 30 August 2004.

References

External links 
 Asteroid Lightcurve Database (LCDB), query form (info )
 Dictionary of Minor Planet Names, Google books
 Asteroids and comets rotation curves, CdR – Observatoire de Genève, Raoul Behrend
 Discovery Circumstances: Numbered Minor Planets (15001)-(20000) – Minor Planet Center
 
 

 

018880
018880
Named minor planets
19991210